Georg Heinrich Borowski (26 July 1746 – 26 July 1801) was a German zoologist born in Königsberg (today's Kaliningrad), East Prussia, to Andreas Ernst Borowski and wife, Maria Regina Negelken.  His elder brother was the Archbishop of Koenigsberg, Ludwig Ernst von Borowski.  He died in Frankfurt a. d. Oder, where he had taught at the university there.

Borowski was professor in the department of natural history and domestic economics at the University of Viadrina. In 1781 he described scientifically the Humpback whale (Megaptera novaeangliae) under the name Balaena novaeangliae in Gemeinnüzzige Naturgeschichte des Thierreichs.

References

External links
BHL Digitised Gemmeinnnüzige Naturgeschichte des Thierreichs (1780- 1789) Georg Heinrich Borowski, Johann Friedrich Wilhelm Herbst and Daniel Friedrich Sotzmann :de:Daniel Friedrich Sotzmann
Zoologica Göttingen State and University Library

18th-century German zoologists
Academic staff of European University Viadrina
1746 births
1801 deaths